Achmester is a historic home and national historic district located near Middletown, New Castle County, Delaware.  It encompasses four contributing buildings and two contributing structures.  Achmester was built in 1829, and is a -story, single pile "Peach Mansion."  It consists of a five bay frame main block with a five bay gable end addition, and five bay rear service ell.  It has a gable roof with dormers and sits on a stone foundation.  The façade features simple box cornices and dormers decorated at a later date with Gothic Revival sawnwork trim, pendents, and vergeboards. The contributing outbuildings consist of a cow barn, shed, milk house, granary, and smokehouse. It was built by Richard Mansfield, a founder of Middletown Academy.

It was listed on the National Register of Historic Places in 1979.

References

External links

Houses on the National Register of Historic Places in Delaware
Historic districts on the National Register of Historic Places in Delaware
Houses in New Castle County, Delaware
Historic American Buildings Survey in Delaware
National Register of Historic Places in New Castle County, Delaware